ABC Radio may refer to:

Australia
 History of ABC Radio (Australia), the division of the Australian Broadcasting Corporation (ABC) responsible for:
 ABC Classic, a classical music radio station
 ABC Classic 2, an un-presented streaming-only classical music radio station
 ABC Local Radio, a network of local radio stations in Australia
 ABC NewsRadio, a national 24-hour news radio service available on several platforms
 ABC Radio National, an Australia-wide radio network 
 ABC Radio Australia, a radio network that broadcasts throughout South-East Asia
 ABC Radio Grandstand, a live sports radio station
 Triple J, a national radio youth network

Elsewhere 
 ABC Audio, a US radio network launched as ABC Radio in 2015
 ABC News Radio, the radio service of the US ABC News
 ABC Radio 1008, radio station broadcast by Asahi Broadcasting Corporation in Osaka, Japan
 ABC Radio 760 AM, broadcast by XEABC-AM, a Mexican radio station 
 ABC Radio (Bangladesh), an FM radio station in Bangladesh
 ABC Radio Networks, former name of Cumulus Media Networks, a defunct American radio network